Change is the second studio album by Vanessa Amorosi, released in Germany in November 2002. It peaked at number 64 on the German Top 100. The album was due to be released in Australia, but it remains unreleased.

Track listing

Charts

Release history

References

2002 albums
Vanessa Amorosi albums
Pop albums by Australian artists